Leonard Edward Feeney (February 18, 1897 – January 30, 1978) was an American Jesuit priest, poet, lyricist, and essayist.

He articulated the interpretation of the Roman Catholic doctrine extra Ecclesiam nulla salus ("outside the Church there is no salvation"). He explained the position that baptism of blood and baptism of desire are unavailing and that therefore no non-Catholics will be saved. Fighting against what he perceived as the liberalization of Catholic doctrine, he came under ecclesiastical censure. He was described as Boston's homegrown version of Father Charles Coughlin for his antisemitism.

Biography 
Feeney was born in Lynn, Massachusetts, on February 18, 1897. In 1914 he entered the Jesuit Novitiate of Saint Andrew in Poughkeepsie, New York. During his 14 year formation as a Jesuit, he studied in England, Wales, Belgium, France, and in his homeland. He took religious vows as a son of Saint Ignatius, and was ordained a priest on June 20, 1928. in the 1930s, he was literary editor at the Jesuit magazine, America.

He was a professor in Boston College's graduate school, and then professor of spiritual eloquence at the Jesuit seminary in Weston, Massachusetts, before he became the priest chaplain at the Catholic Saint Benedict Center, a religious center at Harvard Square founded by Catherine Goddard Clarke, in 1945. (He had first visited in 1941.) He gave incendiary speeches on the Boston Common on Sundays, leading Robert F. Kennedy, then a Harvard undergraduate, to write Archbishop Cushing of Boston requesting his removal. He induced some of the faithful to drop out of Harvard or Radcliffe to become students at his Center, now accredited as a Catholic school. From 1946, the Center published From the Housetops, a periodical focused on Catholic theology that enjoyed contributions from the archbishop himself, but Feeney’s rigid interpretation of Extra Ecclesiam nulla salus put him on a collision course with the same archbishop, Richard Cushing (who became a Cardinal 10 years after these particular incidents; also Senator Edward Kennedy in a memoir claimed that his brother Robert actually met with Cushing about the subject but only after their father first called Cushing).

After April 1949 the affair became a public scandal when Feeney undertook in the press the defence of dismissed laymen who were teaching in the Jesuit College (founded in Boston by the Society of Jesus in 1863) that those who were not members of the Catholic Church were damned.

Feeney criticized Cushing for, among other things, accepting the church's definition of “baptism of desire". Finally, in 1949, Cushing declared Feeney's St. Benedict's Center off-limits to Catholics. That same year Boston College and Boston College High School dismissed four of the Center's members from the theology faculty for spreading Feeney's views in the classroom. In light of his controversial behavior, his Jesuit superiors ordered him to leave the Center for a post at College of the Holy Cross, but he repeatedly refused, which led to his expulsion from the order. Cushing suspended Feeney's priestly faculties in April 1949; Feeney continued to celebrate the sacraments although he was no longer authorized to do so.

On August 8, 1949, Cardinal Francesco Marchetti Selvaggiani of the Holy Office sent a protocol letter to Archbishop Cushing on the meaning of the dogma extra Ecclesiam nulla salus (outside the church there is no salvation), which Feeney refused to accept. This protocol, approved by the Pope on July 28, 1949 stated "(T)his dogma must be understood in that sense in which the Church herself understands it. For, it was not to private judgments that Our Saviour gave for explanation those things that are contained in the deposit of faith, but to the teaching authority of the Church."

On October 25, 1952, Feeney received a letter from Cardinal Pizzardo, Secretary of the Holy Office, summoning the priest to Rome. Feeney replied to Cardinal Pizzardo requesting an explanation of the charges against him in order to prepare his defense as per canon 1723, but none was forthcoming. Petitions to Pope Pius XII went unanswered.

After Feeney repeatedly refused to reply to a summons to Rome to explain himself, he was excommunicated on February 13, 1953 by the Holy See for persistent disobedience to legitimate church authority due to his refusal to comply. According to Cardinal John Wright, Pope Pius XII personally translated the edict into English.

The decree of excommunication was later published in the Acta Apostolicae Sedis in ANNUS XXXX V - SERIES II - VOL. XX, page 100. His followers said that his excommunication was invalid.

Following his excommunication, Feeney set up a community called the Slaves of the Immaculate Heart of Mary. He was reconciled to the Roman Catholic Church in 1972 through the efforts of Boston Archbishop Humberto Cardinal Medeiros, but, given his age and health, was not required to retract or recant his interpretation of "Extra Ecclesiam Nulla Salus". The phrase is inscribed on his tombstone.

Thomas Mary Sennott in his book They Fought the Good Fight wrote:It is to be noted that this document [excommunication] does not contain the seal of the Holy Office, nor is it signed by Cardinal Pizzardo or the Holy Father. The only signature is that of a notary public. Speaking two decades after the controversy Cardinal Avery Dulles judged Feeney's doctrine on a series of lectures not having to do with "extra Ecclesiam..." to be quite sound. Dulles' reflections on Feeney's life did not endorse nor deny Feeney's views on extra Ecclesiam nulla salus, and spoke only to his theology, not his political views on issues such as Zionism.

Feeney died in Ayer, Massachusetts, on January 30, 1978. He received a Mass of Christian Burial by his bishop.

The Point 
Feeney was editor of "The Point," which ran a mixture of theological and political articles, some of them branded anti-semitic by Feeney's critics. The newsletter frequently contained sentiments such as:

... the Church has never abandoned her absolute principle that it is possible for an individual Jew to scrap his hateful heritage, sincerely break with the synagogue, and cleanse his cursed blood with the Precious Blood of Jesus. (October 1957)

Those two powers, the chief two in the world today, are Communism and Zionism. That both movements are avowedly anti-Christian, and that both are in origin and direction
Jewish, is a matter of record. (September 1958)

As surely and securely as the Jews have been behind Freemasonry, or Secularism, or Communism, they are behind the "anti-hate" drive. The Jews are advocating tolerance only for its destructive value — destructive, that is, of the Catholic Church. On their part, they still keep alive their racial rancors and antipathies.(July 1955)

A single year, 1957, saw the following article titles:
January: "Jewish Invasion of Our Country—Our Culture Under Siege"
February: "When Everyone Was Catholic—The Courage of the Faith in the Thirteenth Century"
March: "Dublin's Briscoe Comes to Boston"
April: "The Fight for the Holy City—Efforts of the Jews to Control Jerusalem"
May: "Our Lady of Fatima Warned Us"
June: "The Rejected People of Holy Scripture: Why the Jews Fear the Bible"
July: "The Judaising of Christians by Jews—Tactics of the Church's Leading Enemies"
August: "A Sure Defence Against the Jews—What Our Catholic Bishops Can Do for Us"
September: "An Unholy People in the Holy Land—The Actions of the Jews"
October: "The Jewish Lie About Brotherhood—the Catholic Answer—Israeli Brotherhood"
November: "Six Pointers on the Jews"

The Anti-Defamation League of B'nai B'rith monitored The Point magazine for at least 14 editions. In 1955, the Anti-Defamation League exchanged correspondence with the Federal Bureau of Investigation regarding possible criminal investigation of Feeney and his followers, but no investigation was started.

Reactions and references
As a Harvard undergraduate, Robert F. Kennedy attended a meeting of students at which he stood up and challenged Feeney, later storming out following the priest's assertion that there was no salvation outside the Catholic faith. A similarly negative reaction to Feeney's teaching was recorded by British novelist and Catholic convert Evelyn Waugh, who wrote of visiting the priest while in the United States:

A few years later Feeney wrote critically of Knox and Newman in his collection of essays London is a Place, with an unsympathetic passing reference to Waugh's biography of St. Helena:

In 2003, in an article for The Jewish Week newspaper, editor Gary Rosenblatt wrote:In a lesser-known case, Richard Cardinal Cushing excommunicated a priest, Leonard Feeney, in 1953, for preaching that all non-Catholics would go to Hell. Even though Father Feeney’s words were based on the Gospel, Cardinal Cushing found them offensive, in large part because his sister had married a Jew, said Carroll, and the Cardinal had grown close to the family, sensitizing him to the Jewish perspective toward proselytization.Feeney appears in Paul Theroux's My Secret History: A Novel where he delivers a fiery sermon on Boston Common while surrounded by members of his sect. The adolescent protagonist describes how he "had been scared, but... also been thrilled by his anger and conviction."

Bibliography
 Printed Music
 Printed Music
 Manuscript Music
 Manuscript Music
 Manuscript Music
 Printed Music
 Manuscript Music
 Manuscript Music
 Manuscript Music
 Manuscript Music

See also 
 Feeneyism, a pejorative name for Feeney's obstinate defence of Extra Ecclesiam nulla salus
 Slaves of the Immaculate Heart of Mary, the community he founded

References 

1897 births
1978 deaths
20th-century American Jesuits
Former Jesuits
People temporarily excommunicated by the Catholic Church
People from Lynn, Massachusetts
American lyricists
American male poets
American traditionalist Catholics
Boston College faculty
Traditionalist Catholic conspiracy theorists
Deaths in Massachusetts
Songwriters from Massachusetts
Catholicism and far-right politics
Catholics from Massachusetts
Anti-Masonry
20th-century American male writers